The Emperor's New Groove is the soundtrack to the 2000 Disney film The Emperor's New Groove. It features vocal performances by Shawn Colvin, Tom Jones, Eartha Kitt, Rascal Flatts, and Sting. The album was released in 2000 by Walt Disney Records. The music is by Sting and David Hartley, and the score is by John Debney. The album included many songs that were written for Kingdom of the Sun, the original incarnation for the project. It also included Spanish and Italian versions of "My Funny Friend and Me".

Production
The Emperor's New Groove was one of the first Disney films after 1999's Tarzan that was not a traditional musical, but only featured a few minor songs. The project was originally intended to be a musical film and many songs cut from the film as the plot changed are included in the soundtrack.

JustPressPlay explains:

Track listing

Bonus tracks

References

The Emperor's New Groove
2000s film soundtrack albums
2000 soundtrack albums
Disney animation soundtracks
Walt Disney Records soundtracks
Sting (musician) soundtracks
John Debney soundtracks